Raju Chacha is a 2000 Indian Hindi-language action comedy film directed by Anil Devgan and produced by his brother Ajay Devgn, debuting as a film producer. The film stars Ajay, Kajol and Rishi Kapoor, along with Sanjay Dutt in a special appearance. Raju Chacha was released theatrically on 29 December 2000 in India, whereas on 28 December 2000 (1 day before) in the United States. The film tells the story of Shekhar (Devgn), a con artist who falls in love with Anna (Kajol), the governess of three children belonging to the wealthy widower Siddhant Rai (Kapoor). When Siddhant dies, his children are placed under the custody of their scheming relatives. Shekhar returns into their lives, posing as Rajit Rai, the long lost brother of Siddhant to save the three children and their fortune.

With a budget of 250 million the film was one of the most anticipated films of the year. Upon release, the film received mixed reviews from critics, praising Devgn and Kapoor's performance and visual effects, but criticism for its slow pacing, screenplay and runtime. At the box office, the film failed to recoup its budget, grossing only 209.2 million worldwide.

Plot
Siddhant Rai (Rishi Kapoor) is a wealthy single father looking after his three children, Rohit, Rahul and Rani. Also living with them is the family butler, BBC. Because they have no mother, the three children are so naughty that they drive away any teacher or governess hired by their father.

Due to his work commitments, Siddhant arranges for a new governess much to the dismay of his children. Meanwhile, Shekhar (Ajay Devgn) and his friend Jadu (Johnny Lever) have just robbed a bank and are evading police when Shekhar falls instantly in love with Anna (Kajol) who is on her way to work as the governess for Siddhant's children. Anna is introduced to the children - despite initially trying to drive her away, the children come to accept her as an older sister. After repeated attempts, Shekhar manages to win Anna's heart and with Siddhant's permission, the two are allowed to get married. However, on the wedding day, Shekhar is arrested for stealing the wedding rings and only marrying Anna to get to Siddhant's wealth. A devastated Anna decides to return to the orphanage where she works.

Siddhant is soon killed in an accident and his children are placed under the care of their cruel relatives who only have interest in Siddhant's fortune. Just as the magistrate is about to sign the adoption papers, a strange character enters the Rai household, claiming he is Rajit Rai, the long-lost brother of Siddhant (and therefore the true heir to his fortune) - he is none other than Shekhar. The magistrate is convinced that the man is truly Siddhant's brother so refuses to sign the adoption papers but sets a date for the hearing. The children are at first angry to have Shekhar back in their lives (due to him being a thief). However, BBC and Jadu explain that he is the only one who help save the children's fortune - the children warm up to their new 'Raju Chacha.'

Anna soon returns to the Rai household and is angry to see Shekhar back, believing he is attempting to rob the children. Another man soon enters the household, also claiming to be Rajit Rai - the relatives are confused because this man looks and acts more like Rajit Rai than does Shekhar. Shekhar makes a deal - if the relatives prove that he is the real Rajit Rai, he shall take only 25% of the share. The relatives agree but realise too late that Shekhar conned them and that the 'real' Rajit Rai is actually a fellow conman of his named Gafoor (Sanjay Dutt). The relatives are driven out of the house. Realising that Shekhar was helping the children, Anna starts to fall in love with him again.

Shekhar and Anna look after the children. However, their happiness is short lived when the relatives return and expose Shekhar as a fraud and have him sent back to prison. The children are shocked to learn that their father was murdered by his relatives for his money. Shekhar breaks out of prison and manages to kill the relatives, saving the children, BBC, Jadu, Anna and above all, Siddhant's fortune. Shekhar and Anna get married and are given custody over Rohit, Rahul and Rani. However, they are still looking for the real Raju Chacha.

Cast
Ajay Devgn as Shekhar Chaturvedi / Rajit Rai a.k.a. Raju Chacha
Kajol as Anna / Sanjana Bakshi
Johnny Lever as Jaddu
Rishi Kapoor as Siddhant Rai
Shahbaz Khan as Babu
Sakshi Sem as Rani Rai
Kinshuk Vaidya as Rahul Rai
Harsh Lunia as Rohit Rai
Tiku Talsania as Banky Bihari Chaturdevi (B. B. C.)
Govind Namdev as Vikram Sinha
Pramod Moutho as Prabhakar Sinha
Smita Jaykar as Mother Superior
Anil Nagrath as Magistrate
Sanjay Dutt as Gafoor / Rajit Rai a.k.a. Raju Chacha (special appearance)
Kaivalya Chheda as Daddu, Pramod's son

Production 
Manisha Koirala was signed for the lead role, but opted out due to her commitments to other films. The producer, Ajay Devgn then approached Sunny Deol to play a special appearance as the real Raju Chacha in the film, but Deol was busy with his other projects so Devgn decided to scrap the role from the film. Then, Devgn asked his wife Kajol to play the lead role of Anna for which she agreed. Anil Devgan was signed in to direct the film, thus making his debut as a director. The film's visual effects were provided by Pentamedia Graphics.

Release
Raju Chacha premiered at the Academy of Motion Picture Arts and Sciences' theatres in the United States on 28 December 2000 and was released worldwide on the next day.

Critical reception

The film received mixed reviews from critics. Taran Adarsh of Bollywood Hungama rated the film 3/5, stating,"Both Ajay Devgan and Kajol are seasoned performers and they don't disappoint you one bit. Ajay impresses more in the second half, while Kajol is, like always, more comfortable in dramatic scenes. However, Ajay looks dull in some portions, mainly because he has lost weight. Rishi Kapoor is just about okay. Sanjay Dutt's introduction startles the viewer, but his scenes could've been much more impactful. The kids are confident and camera-friendly." Rediff stated that, "Kajol and Ajay Devgan have perfected the deep-sighing-and-yearning-in-the-eyes look. But their love story has no layers nor dimensions. One can feel the chemistry brewing but, alas, all we get is a faint and unsatisfying whiff of it".

Box Office

The film grossed ₹209.2 million worldwide against a budget of ₹250 million, and was declared as a "Disaster" by Box Office India.

Awards

Star Screen Awards
Won
Best Special Effects
Nominated
Best Action Director - Jaisingh Nijjar
Best Art Direction - Nitin Chandrakant Desai

Music 

The soundtrack of the film contains 7 songs. The music is composed by Jatin–Lalit, with lyrics authored by Anand Bakshi.

References

External links

Ajay Devgn
2000 films
2000s Hindi-language films
Films scored by Jatin–Lalit
Films shot in Ooty
Indian children's films
Indian comedy-drama films
Films with screenplays by Robin Bhatt
Indian films with live action and animation
2000 directorial debut films